James Timothy Moran (born December 3, 1978) is an American-Irish retired professional basketball player and current assistant coach for the NBA's Detroit Pistons.

Playing career
Moran was born in Syosset, New York and attended St. Dominic High School in Oyster Bay from 1993 to 1997. He played on a state championship team during his prep years. After graduating, Moran played four years of college basketball at William & Mary (1997–2001) where he scored 1,324 points and was a two-time All-Colonial Athletic Association (CAA) Team member in his junior and senior seasons.

Moran played his entire professional career for CB Gran Canaria in Spain's Liga ACB (2001 to 2011). On April 21, 2013, Moran became the only player in Gran Canaria history to have his jersey retired. In 10 seasons with the team he recorded 2,060 points, 802 rebounds and 321 assists in 7,452 minutes.

Moran has also competed for Ireland's national team.

Coaching career
In November 2013, Moran began his coaching career as a player development coach for the NBA Development League's Maine Red Claws. He then became the Portland Trail Blazers' associate video coordinator for the 2014–15 season. The Trail Blazers finished that season with a 51–31 record, a Northwest Division championship, and a berth into the Western Conference playoffs as a fourth-seed. Moran was promoted to be a full-time assistant coach upon the start of the 2015–16 season. He then spent the next six years with Portland, but was fired as part of a wholesale coaching staff change at the conclusion of the 2020–21 season. Moran was hired soon thereafter as a top assistant for the Detroit Pistons.

References

External links
 College statistics @ sports-reference.com

1978 births
Living people
American expatriate basketball people in Spain
American men's basketball players
Basketball coaches from New York (state)
Basketball players from New York (state)
CB Gran Canaria players
Detroit Pistons assistant coaches
Ireland men's national basketball team players
Irish expatriate basketball people in Spain
Irish men's basketball players
Liga ACB players
Maine Red Claws coaches
People from Syosset, New York
Portland Trail Blazers assistant coaches
Small forwards
Sportspeople from Nassau County, New York
William & Mary Tribe men's basketball players